AMEU is an abbreviation for:

 African Methodist Episcopal University
 Alma Mater Europaea
 Americans for Middle East Understanding